Arthur French (1764 – 24 November 1820) was an Irish Whig politician.

He belonged to the long-established French family of Frenchpark, County Roscommon, who were substantial landowners who also made money in the wine trade. He was the eldest son of Arthur French MP and Alicia Magenis, daughter of Richard Magenis of Dublin and sister of Richard Magenis. He married Margaret Costello, daughter of Edmond Costello of Edmondstown, County Mayo, and had nine children, including Arthur French, 1st Baron de Freyne, John, 2nd Baron and Charles, 3rd Baron.

In 1783, he was elected a Member of Parliament (MP) for Roscommon County in the Irish House of Commons. After the Act of Union in 1801 he represented Roscommon in the Parliament of the United Kingdom. He was alleged to have been offered an Earldom if he would support the Union of Ireland with Great Britain but refused the honour. Later he also refused a Barony with no strings attached, although in time three of his sons would hold the title Baron de Freyne. The  Crown was frequently irritated by French's demands for offices and favours for his brothers and sons, although such behaviour was entirely typical of an Irish politician at the time.

A critic of the policy of collective fines as a deterrent to the illicit distillation of poteen, he incurred the wrath of Chief Secretary of Ireland Robert Peel who called him "an Abominable fellow", but his enormous popularity in Roscommon meant that he could not be ignored. He also criticized the continuation of martial law in Ireland.

By 1817 he was complaining of ill health: he died on 24 November 1820. One report at the time states that he had died "from excessive fox hunting".

References

Mosley, Charles (editor). Burke's Peerage, Baronetage and Knightage: 107th Edition.
French, Maurice. The Frenchs of French Park. Warminster: Maurice French, 1999.

1764 births
1820 deaths
19th-century Irish people
Politicians from County Roscommon
Irish MPs 1783–1790
Irish MPs 1790–1797
Irish MPs 1798–1800
Members of the Parliament of Ireland (pre-1801) for County Roscommon constituencies
Members of the Parliament of the United Kingdom for County Roscommon constituencies (1801–1922)
UK MPs 1801–1802
UK MPs 1802–1806
UK MPs 1806–1807
UK MPs 1807–1812
UK MPs 1812–1818
UK MPs 1818–1820